Lospalos — sometimes erroneously written as Los Palos, assuming a nonexistent Spanish etymology — is a city in East Timor,  to the east of Dili, the national capital. Lospalos has a population of 17,186 (2006) and is the capital of Lautém Municipality and the Lospalos Administrative Post. The subdistrict has a population of 25,417 (2004).

Internationally, "Lospalos" is mistakenly spelled as Los Palos, suggesting a Spanish origin of the name. In fact, it is derived from Lohoasupala, the name in Fataluku, the local Papuan language, although nowadays Fataluku speakers use the name Lospala. The preferred spelling in English, as well as Tetum and Portuguese, the official languages of East Timor, is Lospalos.

Lospalos is the birth city of the co-founder and president of the party APODETI, Frederico Almeida Santos Costa.

Climate
Lospalos has a tropical savanna climate (Köppen Aw) with a dry season from August to October and a wet season covering the remaining nine months.

Sport

Football
FC Beltratez Lospalos

References

External links 

Photos of Lospalos

Populated places in East Timor
Lautém Municipality